The 2017 Women's Knockout Cup is New Zealand's women's 24th knockout football competition.

The 2017 competition had three rounds before quarter-finals, semi-finals, and a final. Competition was run in three regions (northern, central, southern) until the quarter-finals, from which stage the draw was open. In all, 38 teams entered the competition.

The 2017 final
The 2017 final was played between two Auckland teams Glenfield Rovers and Eastern Suburbs at QBE Stadium before the men's Chatham Cup final. This was Glenfield Rovers seventh final appearance, having won three and lost three previously including the 2016 final, while Eastern Suburbs have only been in the final once before in 2005 where they lost to Lynn-Avon United. Glenfield went on to win the game 5–4 which was slightly generous to Suburbs in a game where Glenfield created more chances. Kate Loye from Rovers was the winner of the Maia Jackman trophy for the most valuable player.

Results

Round 1

Central/Capital Region

Mainland Region

Southern Region

All teams listed below received byes to the second round.
Northern Region: Forrest Hill Milford, Glenfield Rovers, Hibiscus Coast, Norwest United, Ellerslie, Central United, Eastern Suburbs, Fencibles United, Metro FC, Papakura City, Three Kings United, Western Springs, Claudelands Rovers, Hamilton Wanderers, Otumoetai FC, Rotorua United.
Central/Capital Region: Palmerston North Marist, Wellington United, Upper Hutt City, Seatoun, Wairarapa United, Stop Out.
Mainland Region: Cashmere Technical FC.
Southern Region: Otago University, Dunedin Technical, Queenstown Rovers.

Round 2

Northern Region

Central/Capital Region

Mainland Region

Southern Region

Round 3

Northern Region

Central/Capital Region

Mainland/Southern Region

Quarter-finals

Semi-finals

Final

References

External links
Women's knockout cup section on the New Zealand Football website

Women's Knockout Cup/Kate Sheppard Cup
Women's Knockout Cup
Women's Knockout Cup
Women's Knockout Cup
football